The military history of Latin America includes:

 Military history of Argentina
 Military history of Colombia
 Military history of Costa Rica
 Military history of Cuba
 Military history of the Dominican Republic
 Military history of Ecuador
 Military history of Mexico
 Military history of Bolivia
 Military history of Brazil
 Military history of Haiti
 Military history of Honduras
 Military history of Paraguay
 Military history of Peru
 Military history of Uruguay
 Military history of Nicaragua
 Military history of Panama
 Military history of Puerto Rico
 Military history of Venezuela

 
Latin American history